Andres Fernandes Gonçalves (born 21 July 1986), known as just Baraka, is a Brazilian footballer who plays as a defensive midfielder for Sampaio Corrêa.

External links

References

1986 births
Living people
Association football midfielders
Brazilian footballers
Clube Atlético Linense players
Oeste Futebol Clube players
Associação Atlética Flamengo players
Mogi Mirim Esporte Clube players
Figueirense FC players
Criciúma Esporte Clube players
Associação Atlética Ponte Preta players
Coritiba Foot Ball Club players
Ceará Sporting Club players
Esporte Clube Santo André players
Guarani FC players
Al Batin FC players
Esporte Clube Vitória players
Al-Ansar FC (Medina) players
Saudi Professional League players
Saudi First Division League players
Brazilian expatriate sportspeople in Saudi Arabia
Expatriate footballers in Saudi Arabia